Zulfugar "Zulfu" Samad oglu Adigozalov (1898, near Shusha – 1963, Baku) was a Soviet ethnic Azerbaijani and khananda folk singer. He was the father of composer  Vasif Adigozalov, violinist Rauf Adigozalov, and the grandfather of conductor Yalchin Adigozalov.

Career

Zulfu Adigozalov was born into a family of a semi-nomadic cattle-breeder in the village of Garadolag, near present-day Agjabadi. He started singing as an amateur at a young age, but was later trained professionally by the renowned folk singer Musa Shushinski and sazanda Tatevos Harutyunov, specializing in the Rast variety of mugham. In the mid-1920s he moved to Ganja where he started his professional career. In 1927 Adigozalov settled in the capital city of Baku to work as a soloist with the Azerbaijan State Philharmonic Society. In 1929–1932 he performed at the Azerbaijan State Opera Theatre. During the German-Soviet War Zulfu Adigozalov along with other Azerbaijani artists gave concerts for soldiers on frontlines. In 1943 he was recognized as an Honorary Artist of Azerbaijan.

References

Further reading
 Zohrabov, Ramiz. Zulfu Adigozalov in Memories. Shur: Baku, 1999

1898 births
1963 deaths
Soviet male singers
Soviet Azerbaijani people
20th-century Azerbaijani male singers